MyRepublic Group Limited is a Singaporean communications services provider, and is the world's first telecommunications company powered by a proprietary cloud platform. Launched in 2011, MyRepublic operates in the Asia-Pacific region, with operations in Singapore, Australia and New Zealand. MyRepublic also licenses its platform to operators in Brunei  and Indonesia.

MyRepublic Group Limited is a group of companies that includes the following business units:

 MyRepublic, the Group’s ServCo business unit, is a digital telco operator in Asia-Pacific, offering residential broadband, enterprise broadband, home voice, mobile and cloud services in Singapore, Australia, and New Zealand. 
 MyRepublic Digital, the Group’s platform business unit, is an end-to-end digital enabler and accelerator that provides companies around the world with the technology, skills and expertise to interaction with customers.

History
2011

 MyRepublic was founded by Malcolm Rodrigues, a former Vice President of StarHub International and Wholesale; KC Lai, a former StarHub Senior VP of Consumer Sales; and Greg Mittman, previously a lead of Alcatel-Lucent's National Broadband Network Team on 25 July 2011.
 Shortly after the incorporation of MyRepublic, the corporate office in Singapore was set up, and key hires made in the engineering and operations teams.
 In May 2011, MyRepublic reached 1,000 subscribers in Singapore.
 MyRepublic became a licensed telecommunications carrier in Singapore in October 2011, and shortly after, MyRepublic signed the Interconnection Agreement with the National Broadband Company in Singapore.  
 A soft launch of MyRepublic took place in mid-December 2011.

2012

 MyRepublic launched its operations in Singapore on February 16, 2012 with 22 full-time staff, and less than 100 subscribers on the network.
 By the end of 2012, MyRepublic had 450 resellers, 10,000 subscribers and more than S$5 million in revenue. Rodrigues attributed the growth of the company to its “thin operator model”, which was unburdened by costly legacy infrastructure.

2014

 MyRepublic began expanding its operations overseas, with the first expansion to New Zealand in January 2014.
 In January 2014, MyRepublic launched a 1Gbps service for S$49.95/month plan – a first in the industry and South East Asia. 
 In May 2014, the company received a S$4.4 million investment from Indonesian energy company Dian Swastatika Sentosa, part of Indonesian conglomerate Sinar Mas.
 In July, the company received another S$30 million investment. Sunshine Network, a telecommunications arm of Sinar Mas invested S$20 million, while Xavier Niel, founder of French telecommunications company Free invested S$10 million.

2015

 MyRepublic expanded its operations to Indonesia in July, to at an initial nine locations, presenting an opportunity for MyRepublic to extend its lean operator model into a non-NBN market.
 MyRepublic announced plans to expand and launch its services in Australia in August.
 In September, MyRepublic raised S$23 million in capital, including investment from Brunei's leading telecommunications provider, DST, a major investor.
 In October, MyRepublic held a Mobility Trial as part of IMDA's trial of HetNet, or heterogeneous network, in Jurong Lake District. The trial was limited to 1,000 trial users and confined to certain areas such as malls, public housing blocks, bus interchanges and MRT train stations.

2016

 In March, MyRepublic launched a self-service plug-and-play wide area network (WAN) service for businesses.
 In November, MyRepublic officially launched its operations in Australia.

2017

 In July, MyRepublic officially connected the first town in Australian (Wollongong, NSW) to consumer grade NBN 1Gbps connections.
 MyRepublic was named one of the 2017 winners of the Red Hat Innovation Awards APAC for Singapore in September for its outstanding and innovative use of Red Hat solutions.

2018

 In February, MyRepublic was ranked #64 on the Financial Times' inaugural Top 1000 fastest growing companies in Asia-Pacific.
 In March, Eugene Yeo, the CIO for MyRepublic, was nominated as a finalist for CIO of the Year by TM Forum, alongside the CIOs for British Telecom, T-Mobile USA, Bharti Airtel and China Unicom. 
 Launched MyRepublic Connected Business, a streamlined networking solution designed to meet the end-to-end needs of Retail, F&B and Hospitality businesses, in partnership with Cisco Meraki in May.
 Announced its Mobile Virtual Network Operator (MVNO) partnership with StarHub in May, to utilise StarHub's mobile network infrastructure to offer mobile services in Singapore.
 In June, MyRepublic announced US$60m in new investment from CLSA Capital Partners, the asset management business of CLSA, Asia's leading capital markets and investment group, and Kamet Capital Partners, a Singapore family office.

2019

 In September, Brunei's largest mobile operator DST selected MyRepublic as its partner to manage Brunei's telecom infrastructure carveout and the DST transformation to a quad-play thin operator.

2020

 In February, MyRepublic Singapore commissioned its first Wi-Fi 6 (AX) managed Wi-Fi network for its enterprise customers.
 In April, MyRepublic Singapore installed and commissioned a managed Wi-Fi network serving thousands of users in less than 14 days during the COVID-19 Circuit Breaker period.
 In October, MyRepublic and M1 Limited (M1) signed an agreement for MyRepublic to deliver an enhanced suite of mobile services as a Mobile Virtual Network Operator (MVNO) using M1’s mobile network infrastructure.
2021
 In March, the rebranding campaign of MyRepublic was launched, appearing across MRT stations and digital channels.
 Later, in May, it was launched a self-serve SIM card activation service for new mobile customers.
 At the same time, MyRepublic refreshed its SMB and enterprise service offerings which included Microsoft 365, Teams, and a cybersecurity suite designed in partnership with IT solutions provider Inspira Enterprise.
 In September, the majority interest of MyRepublic's broadband business was acquired by StarHub. StarHub’s total investment was up to $162.8 million. MyRepublic’s other business units, mobile, Australia, and New Zealand, and its Platform business, later known as MyRepublic Digital remained fully owned by MyRepublic Group.

2022

 In September, MyRepublic Group launched MyRepublic Digital, a platform-as-a-service spin-off company, and its flagship product Encore, a cloud-native digital platform.

Markets

Singapore

Consumer broadband 
MyRepublic offers fibre broadband and voice services to residential customers in Singapore over the country's Next-Generation Nationwide Broadband Network (Next Gen NBN). In 2012, the company launched in Singapore with fibre broadband Internet plans offering speeds of up to 150 Mbit/s, as well as the country's first no-contract term Internet plans.

In February 2012, MyRepublic rolled out its GAMER fibre broadband packages, becoming the first Internet service provider in Singapore to offer fibre broadband plans specifically catered towards gamers. MyRepublic is most well-known for its GAMER fibre broadband package, which features lower latency to popular games.

In May 2015, MyRepublic launched the first-ever 1Gbps no-contract fibre broadband plan in Singapore, targeted at users who want greater flexibility and are unwilling to commit to a 12- or 24-month contract.

In September 2021, according to the internet analysis firm’s Q4 Speedtest, MyRepublic became the country’s fastest provider, recording a Speed Score of 258.01.

Enterprise Connectivity 
The company also offers fibre broadband, voice and managed Wi-Fi services to business customers in the country.

In 2016, it launched MySDN, its first enterprise connectivity service, available to customers across the region, including Singapore, Indonesia, and New Zealand.

In 2022, MyRepublic announced the launch of Ignite, a brand-new suite of enterprise ICT (Information and Communications Technology) specialized to Small and Medium Enterprises (SMEs) in Singapore.

MyRepublic Digital 
MyRepublic Digital is a spin-off company of MyRepublic that aims to simplify and productize digital transformation for telcos and aspiring digital brands worldwide. The company’s product is Encore, a cloud-native digital platform-as-a-service with OSS/BSS features.

MyRepublic Digital is helmed by Jason Ong, previously APAC (Asia Pacific) region head of Tech Mahindra.

Bid to be Singapore's fourth telco 
In 2014, MyRepublic announced its interest to be Singapore's 4th telco, after Singtel, StarHub and M1, promising to introduce unlimited mobile data plans as a telco.

In April 2015,  MyRepublic announced plans to hold a mobility trial in Jurong Lake District in the second half of 2015, as part of the Government's trial of HetNet, or heterogeneous network. HetNet is a new wireless system that leveraged NBN as part of a mobile network, allowing mobile phone users to automatically hop across networks to minimise surfing slowdowns or disruptions. As part of the trial, MyRepublic gave out 1,000 free SIM cards with unlimited 4G data to trial participants in the coverage area.

In September 2015, the company submitted its bid for the New Entrant Spectrum Auction (NESA) along with two other companies - Australian telco TPG Telecom and Singapore start-up airYotta. Of the three, only MyRepublic and TPG were pre-qualified to participate in the NESA.

MyRepublic participated in the NESA in December 2016, but ultimately exited the auction at S$102.5 million and ceded the license to TPG, citing concerns that bidding higher would not make sense for its business case.

In May 2017, reports emerged that MyRepublic was looking for private equity backing to bid for Singaporean telecommunications company M1, which would allow it to get back into the Singapore Telco market despite losing the 4th telco license. In a press conference later that year, MyRepublic confirmed the report but added that it was no longer interested in buying M1 and that it would seek to offer mobile services as a mobile virtual network operator (MVNO) instead.

Mobile services offering 
In May 2018, MyRepublic announced that it had formed a Mobile Virtual Network Operator (MVNO) agreement with local telco StarHub, enabling it to offer mobile services using StarHub's mobile infrastructure. In June 2018, MyRepublic rolled out three new mobile price plans, starting from S$35/month. Offering a "boundless" data offering, the plans allowed customers to continue to consume data at reduced speeds once they hit the data limit of their plans without additional charges.

In October 2020, MyRepublic and M1 Limited (M1) signed an agreement for MyRepublic to deliver an enhanced suite of mobile services as a Mobile Virtual Network Operator (MVNO) using M1’s mobile network infrastructure.

In January 2023, MyRepublic announced its foray into 5G and introduced their 5G plan offerings using StarHub's 5G Standalone/4G/3G infrastructure. MyRepublic's 4G plan offerings will continue to be using M1's 4G/3G infrastructure.

Australia

Launch and rollout of NBN plans 
MyRepublic entered the Australian market in November 2016 with a primary goal to become the People's Champions when it comes to speed and lobbying for access to high speed internet at affordable prices. MyRepublic launched with one plan - Unlimited NBN with up to 100Mbps download and up to 40Mbps upload speeds for A$59.99 per month. In the same year, MyRepublic launched the first nbn™ plan for Gamers - Unlimited NBN optimised for gaming with up to 100Mbps download and up to 40Mbps upload speeds for A$69.99 per month.

Gigatown competition 
In 2017, MyRepublic launched the “Gigatown” Competition to connect Australia's first town to consumer-grade 1Gbps gigabit service. MyRepublic wanted to demonstrate the benefits of ultra- fast next generation fibre and the benefits it could deliver to consumers and small businesses. MyRepublic ran the Gigatown petition and gathered over 6,000 responses from individuals who expressed their feelings towards how they felt about their current internet speeds. MyRepublic began offering their 1Gbit/s speed tier packages to Wollongong at A$129/month with unlimited data as part of their Gigatown Competition. At the end of 2017, MyRepublic expanded and launched NBN Small Business products to market.

MyRepublic announced to its customers on the 24th January 2023, that it would be exiting the Australian fixed broadband market and transferring customers to Superloop Ltd.

Indonesia 
In July 2015, MyRepublic launched in Indonesia, marking MyRepublic's second overseas expansion after New Zealand. MyRepublic began offering broadband services in nine areas in Indonesia.

In 2021, MyRepublic Indonesia targeted enterprise space and increased its service offerings for this customer sector to include cybersecurity.

New Zealand

Entry to market 
MyRepublic entered New Zealand's Internet service provider market in October 2014, offering fibre broadband services to homes and businesses on the country's Ultrafast Fibre Broadband initiative. It was the country's first Internet service provider to launch 100/20Mbps unlimited-only broadband plans.

In July 2022, MyRepublic entered the mobile market with unlimited phone data plans.

Products and services

Consumer broadband services 
MyRepublic offers several fibre broadband products and services for residential consumers across the Asia-Pacific region, including:

 Fibre broadband services in Singapore, New Zealand, Indonesia and Australia.
 GAMER broadband services in Singapore, New Zealand, Indonesia and Australia, which offers lower latency Internet connections for popular games. 
 VDSL in New Zealand.

Gaming

GAMER Arena 
In November 2018, MyRepublic launched the MyRepublic GAMER Arena, an esports initiative for aspiring esports gamers aiming to support and encourage the next generation of professional gamers in Singapore, at GameStart Asia, Southeast Asia's premier game convention. The first season of GAMER Arena kicked off in January 2019.

MyRepublic GAMER Arena is a “rookie league” that provides competitive gamers with accessible, free-to-participate, regularly-scheduled tournaments to hone their skills and win prizes. MyRepublic GAMER Arena also provides participants the opportunity to meet with other like-minded gamers as well as showcase their skills to teams or brands who might be recruiting.

In December 2019, MyRepublic announced the expansion of the scale of GAMER Arena into the first-ever regional tournament series in partnership with PlayStation, which kickstarted in 2020 across Singapore, Indonesia, Malaysia and Thailand. 
GAMER Arena has received sponsorship support from various partners such as ASUS Republic of Gamers (ROG), PlayStation, Secretlab, Sony Electronics Singapore, Warner Bros. Interactive Entertainment, and Armageddon.

Gamer broadband service

In September 2022, MyRepublic announced a free upgrade of its Gamer broadband service to 2Gbps.

Achievement Unlocked 
In May 2020, MyRepublic announced the launch of a new gamer engagement programme, Achievement Unlocked, which will see gamers being rewarded for unlocking various weekly or season in-game achievements.

The first-of-its-kind engagement programme brings together passionate gamers in Singapore, spotlighting their achievements, skillset and dedication to their gameplay.

Mobile services 
MyRepublic launched mobile services as an MVNO in Singapore in 2018 by utilising StarHub's mobile network infrastructure. It also intends to launch as an MVNO in its other markets, though it has not announced any partnerships or tie-ups in other countries.

In October 2020, MyRepublic and M1 Limited (M1) signed an agreement for MyRepublic to deliver an enhanced suite of mobile services as a Mobile Virtual Network Operator (MVNO) using M1’s mobile network infrastructure.

In January 2023, MyRepublic launched 5G plans using StarHub's network.

Voice 
MyRepublic offers fixed-voice services to business customers in Singapore.

VoIP 
MyRepublic offers Voice over Internet Protocol services with cloud-based PBX and SIP Trunking to business customers in Singapore and Australia. As for New Zealand, MyRepublic offers consumers and businesses VDSL, Fibre, HyperFibre®️ along with Voice (VOIP), and GAMER broadband services.

Enterprise broadband services 
MyRepublic offers broadband and managed Wi-Fi services in Singapore, Australia and New Zealand, including:

 Fiber Broadband | Layer 2 VPN connectivity | Managed Wi-Fi | Ignite | MyRepublic Digital LTE Broadband | LTE Backup (Singapore)
 Fiber Broadband (Australia and New Zealand)

References

External links
Singapore website
New Zealand website
Australia website

Internet in Singapore
Telecommunications companies of Singapore
Internet service providers of Singapore
Internet service providers of New Zealand
Singaporean brands
Mobile virtual network operators
New Zealand companies established in 2011
Telecommunications companies established in 2011
Singaporean companies established in 2011